Celebrate may refer to:

Music

Albums
 Celebrate (Bonnie Tyler album), UK title of Wings, or the title song, 2006
 Celebrate (James Durbin album) or the title song, 2014
 Celebrate – Live, by the Archers, or the title song, 1980
 Celebrate!, by Kool & the Gang, 1980
 Celebrate: The Greatest Hits, by Simple Minds, or the title song (see below), 2013
 Celebrate: The Three Dog Night Story, 1965–1975 or the title song (see below), 1993
 Celebrate, by Hi-5, 2002
 Celebrate, by Tiny Moving Parts, 2016
 Celebrate, by Twice, 2022

EPs
 Celebrate (EP), by Highlight, or the title song, 2017
 Celebrate – The Night of the Warlock, by Doro Pesch, or the title song, 2008
 Celebrate, by JoJo Siwa, 2019

Songs
 "Celebrate" (CeCe Peniston song), 2012
 "Celebrate" (Empire of the Sun song), 2014
 "Celebrate" (Mika song), 2012
 "Celebrate" (Three Dog Night song), 1969
 "Celebrate" (Whitney Houston and Jordin Sparks song), 2012
 "Celébrate", by Miki Núñez, 2019
 "Celebrate", by Alex O
 "Celebrate", by Alexandra Stan from Unlocked, 2014
 "Celebrate", by An Emotional Fish, 1989
 "Celebrate", by Black Eyed Peas from Translation, 2020
 "Celebrate", by Brass Construction, 1978
 "Celebrate", by DaBaby from Baby on Baby, 2019
 "Celebrate", by Daria Kinzer, representing Croatia in the Eurovision Song Contest 2011
 "Celebrate", by Dirty Heads from Swim Team, 2017
 "Celebrate", by DJ Khaled from Father of Asahd, 2019
 "Celebrate", by Ingrid Michaelson from It Doesn't Have to Make Sense, 2016
 "Celebrate", by Little Dragon from Season High, 2017
 "Celebrate", by Metric from Pagans in Vegas, 2015
 "Celebrate", by Piero Esteriore & The MusicStars, representing Switzerland in the Eurovision Song Contest 2004
 "Celebrate", by Pitbull from Globalization, 2014
 "Celebrate", by Simple Minds from Empires and Dance, 1980
 "Celebrate", by Wiz Khalifa from Khalifa, 2016

Other uses
 Celebrate! Tokyo Disneyland, a 2018–2019 nighttime show
 Celebrate, a Christian magazine edited by Peter Youngren

See also
 
 Celebration (disambiguation)
 Celebrant (disambiguation)